Martin Paul McLoughlin (born c. 1980) is a former Ireland international rugby league footballer who played in the 2000s. He played at club level for the Wigan Warriors, Barrow Raiders, Oldham, Batley Bulldogs, Widnes Vikings, and the Rochdale Hornets.

Background
McLoughlin was born in England.

International honours
Martin McLoughlin was capped for Ireland while at Wigan Warriors, Oldham R.L.F.C., and Batley Bulldogs in 2001–2008.

References

External links
Statistics at rugby.widnes.tv
Rivett makes Wolves exit
Wolfhounds name Cup final squad
Ireland plan to give it a go
McDermott sits out Ireland game
Irish out to seal World Cup spot
McLoughlin injury blow for Widnes

Living people
Barrow Raiders players
Batley Bulldogs players
English rugby league players
Ireland national rugby league team players
Oldham R.L.F.C. players
Place of birth missing (living people)
Rochdale Hornets players
Rugby league props
Widnes Vikings players
Wigan Warriors players
Year of birth missing (living people)